The Central Park West Historic District is located along Central Park West, between 61st and 97th Streets, on the Upper West Side of Manhattan in New York City, United States. The district was added to the National Register of Historic Places on November 9, 1982. The district encompasses a portion of the Upper West Side-Central Park West Historic District as designated by the New York City Landmarks Preservation Commission, and contains a number of prominent New York City designated landmarks, including the Dakota, a National Historic Landmark. The buildings date from the late 19th century to the early 1940s and exhibit a variety of architectural styles. The majority of the district's buildings are of neo-Italian Renaissance style, but Art Deco is a popular theme as well.

History
The buildings that are part of the historic district were mostly developed in the 1880s through 1930s, following the construction of Central Park. This was further spurred by the construction of the Ninth Avenue Elevated, which provided easy access to Lower Manhattan. Tenements and row houses lined Amsterdam and Columbus Avenues (formerly Tenth and Ninth Avenues, respectively), while more upscale luxury buildings were built on Central Park West (formerly Eighth Avenue). Generally, the further away a lot was from Columbus Avenue and its elevated railway, the more upscale the house was likely to become. By the early 20th century, the row houses were destroyed to make way for apartment buildings. The construction of the New York City Subway's Eighth Avenue Line in the 1920s accelerated this process of redevelopment.

The Central Park West Historic District was federally recognized on November 9, 1982, when it was added to the National Register of Historic Places. It had been designated by the New York City Landmarks Preservation Commission (LPC) in 1973. The LPC designation covered a T-shaped area, which included one block of West 76th Street, two adjacent blocks of Central Park West and a short stretch of West 77th Street, as the Central Park West–76th Street Historic District. The local designation and boundaries persisted well past the 1982 National Register listing.

In 1990 the LPC formally extended the local boundaries of the Central Park West–76th Street Historic District to include almost all of the area included in the boundaries of the federal historic district. The much larger Upper West Side-Central Park West Historic District includes the area from 96th Street to 62nd Street and Central Park West to Amsterdam Avenue.

Boundaries
The Central Park West Historic District is a linear historic district including the stretch of Central Park West from 61st to 97th Streets. When the Upper West Side–Central Park West Historic District was designated in 1990 as a local historic district its boundaries closely mirrored those of the 1982 Central Park West Historic District, except the local historic district encompasses land stretching to Amsterdam Avenue. The federal historic district is considerably smaller than the local district.

Architecture
The expanse of Central Park West between 61st and 97th Streets is a mixture of late 19th- and early 20th-century architectural styles. By far the district's most dominant style is Neo-Renaissance, mostly neo-Italian Renaissance though there are German and Flemish Renaissance influences found in some of the structures. Art Deco, Second Empire, Beaux-Arts and Neoclassical architecture are all found in multiple buildings. Gothic and Romanesque Revival influences can be found combined with other styles in some of the buildings as well as on their own. A few Queen Anne, Art Moderne and Italianate buildings dot the streetscape of Central Park West.

Structures
Of the buildings within the boundaries of the historic district only one was considered a non-contributing property to the historic character of the district when it was nominated to the National Register: the building located at 80 Central Park West, a 1965 modern building. The area within the district is home to nearly 40 high-quality, luxury apartment highrises. Sprinkled within the residential buildings are four Christian churches, one synagogue, several smaller-scale, multi-family houses, the New York Society for Ethical Culture, the New York Historical Society and the American Museum of Natural History.

Contributing properties 
These properties are contributing properties to the Central Park West Historic District. In general this means that they add to the character of the historic district.

Non-contributing properties

Significance
The Central Park West Historic District is significant, in regards to the National Register, for its architecture and its character as a cohesive residential area. The district is located along one of the city's finest residential streets and consists mostly of apartment buildings which are among some of the earliest in New York.

With the 1990 local boundary increase the NYLPC developed the theme that the strength of the historic district lay in its diversity. The Commission called the buildings in the district brashly "commercial" and "stylistically diverse." The Commission went on to stress the importance of the district's special skyline that challenged the whole of the New York skyline. "The stylistically diverse buildings of Central Park West create a streetscape and a skyline which is exuberant and varied as to scale, height and form", the Commission stated.

References
Explanatory notes

Citations

Sources

 Brockmann, Jorg and Bill Harris. (2002).  One Thousand New York Buildings. New York: Black Dog & Leventhal. ;  OCLC 48619292
 "Historic Resources (Appendix 1)", Second Avenue Subway Final Environmental Impact Study, April 2004, Metropolitan Transportation Authority. Retrieved April 5, 2007.
 Biographies of American Architects: Who Died Between 1897 and 1947, Society of Architectural Historians. Retrieved April 3, 2007
 Central Park West Historic District, (Java), National Register of Historic Places Nomination Form, New York's State and National Registers of Historic Places Document Imaging Project , New York State Historic Preservation Office. Retrieved April 2, 2007.
 Congregation Shearith Israel, Building Report, International Survey of Jewish Monuments. Retrieved April 3, 2007.
 
 

 
Historic districts on the National Register of Historic Places in Manhattan
Central Park
Upper West Side
Eighth Avenue (Manhattan)
Historic districts in Manhattan
New York City Designated Landmarks in Manhattan
New York City designated historic districts